Anthony Adams  is an American lawyer and politician who served as former deputy-mayor of Detroit, who served under Kwame Kilpatrick. Adams was a candidate in the 2021 Detroit mayoral election, running against current Detroit mayor, Mike Duggan, after advancing from the August primary.

Adams has also served as interim director of Detroit Water and Sewerage Department and was elected President of the Detroit Public School Board, prior to Detroit's financial emergency management. He was also an executive assistant to Mayor Coleman Young. In 2021, Anthony Adams made headlines when he called for a return to Detroit control of the area water system amid the summer's massive flooding, saying scrapping the regional authority created in the city's bankruptcy is the only way to prevent future problems. An attorney, Adams filed suit against DSWD seeking a return of the administrative function from the Great Lakes Water Authority, which was founded in 2014 as a part of the City of Detroit's bankruptcy proceedings.

References

21st-century American politicians
African-American people in Michigan politics
Candidates in the 2021 United States elections
Living people
Michigan Democrats
Politicians from Cincinnati
Politicians from Detroit
Year of birth missing (living people)